Lisburn City Council was the local authority for an area partly in County Antrim and partly in County Down in Northern Ireland. As of May 2015 it was merged with Castlereagh Borough Council as part of the reform of local government in Northern Ireland to become Lisburn and Castlereagh City Council.

Created in 1974, the council was the second largest in the Belfast Metropolitan Area. Council headquarters were in the city of Lisburn. The council area included Glenavy and Dundrod in the north, Dromara and Hillsborough in the south, Moira and Aghalee in the west, and Drumbo in the east.

The council area consisted of five electoral areas: Downshire, Dunmurry Cross, Killultagh, Lisburn Town North and Lisburn Town South. It had 30 councillors, last elected in 2011. The final composition was: 14 Democratic Unionist Party (DUP), 5 Ulster Unionist Party (UUP), 5 Sinn Féin, 3 Alliance Party and 3 Social Democratic and Labour Party (SDLP).

For elections to the Westminster Parliament, the council area was split between the Lagan Valley constituency, Belfast West and South Antrim constituencies.

The first elections for the new council took place in May 2014.

Constituent cities, towns and villages
Aghalee
Annahilt
Dunmurry
Drumbo
Dromara
Glenavy
Hillsborough
Lisburn
Maghaberry
Moira

Summary of seats won 1973-2011

Notes: The independent elected in 1997 was Hugh Lewsley, a former SDLP councillor. William Beattie was elected as a "Protestant Unionist" in 1997, but is tallied as an Independent Unionist above. New legislation introduced for the 2001 elections required candidates to register party names for these to appear on the ballot paper, this also made it impossible for candidates to stand as Independent Unionist. The UDP missed the deadline for registration and their candidate, party leader Gary McMichael, was elected as an independent. The other candidate elected as an independent in 2001, described himself as a Unionist on the council website.

Source: ARK Retrieved 13 January 2013

2011 Election results
2011 saw the continued advancement of the DUP and Sinn Féin within the council Area.  In Downshire, the DUP picked up a seat from the UUP, and in Dunmurry Cross, Sinn Féin gained from the SDLP.  However the SDLP loss was compensated by changing demographics in the Lisburn Town North DEA, where the SDLP took a seat for the first time.  There were no changes in the Killutagh or Lisburn Town South DEAs. The election saw the DUP return all their candidates with the exception of Ben Mallon, a local student standing in Lisburn North.

Mayors of Lisburn
 1964 – 70: James Howard (1st Mayor of the Borough of Lisburn)
 1970 – 73: Hugh Gray Bass
 1977 – 78?: Elsie Kelsey, Ulster Unionist Party
 1978 – 79:george mc cartney.

 1979 – 81: Alderman Dr Samuel Semple MBE, Ulster Unionist Party
 1981 – 83: Billy Belshaw, Democratic Unionist Party
 1983 – 85: Maureen McKinney, Ulster Unionist Party
 1985 – 87: Walter Lilburn, Ulster Unionist Party
 1987 – 88:
 1988 – 89: Billy Bleakes, Ulster Unionist Party
 1990 – 91: Willam McAllister, Ulster Unionist Party
 1991 – 93: Ivan Davis, Ulster Unionist Party
 1993 – 94: Seamus Close, Alliance Party of Northern Ireland
 1994 – 96: Harry Lewis Ulster Unionist Party
 1996 – 98?: George Morrison, Ulster Unionist Party
 1998 – 00: Peter O'Hagan, Social Democratic and Labour Party
 2000 – 02: Jim Dillon, Ulster Unionist Party
 2002 – 03: Betty Campbell, Alliance Party of Northern Ireland
 2003 – 04: Billy Bell, Ulster Unionist Party
 2004 – 05: Cecil Calvert, Democratic Unionist Party
 2005 – 06: Jonathan Craig, Democratic Unionist Party
 2006 – 07: Trevor Lunn, Alliance Party of Northern Ireland
 2007 – 08: James Tinsley, Democratic Unionist Party
 2008 – 09: Ronnie Crawford, Ulster Unionist Party
 2009 – 10: Allan Ewart, Democratic Unionist Party
 2010 – 11: Paul Porter, Democratic Unionist Party
 2011 – 12: Brian Heading, Social Democratic and Labour Party
 2012 – 13: William Leathem, Democratic Unionist Party
 2013 – 14: Margaret Tolerton, Democratic Unionist Party
 2014 – 15: Andrew Ewing, Democratic Unionist Party
 2018 - 19: Uel Mackin, Democratic Unionist Party

Review of Public Administration
Under the Review of Public Administration (RPA) the council was due to merge with Castlereagh Borough Council in 2011 to form a single council for the enlarged area totalling 540 km2 and a population of 175,182. An election was due to take place in May 2009, but on 25 April 2008, Shaun Woodward, Secretary of State for Northern Ireland announced that the scheduled 2009 district council elections were to be postponed until the introduction of the eleven new councils in 2011. The introduction of the new councils was subsequently postponed until 2015.

Population
The area covered by Lisburn City Council had a population of 120,165 residents according to the 2011 Northern Ireland census.

See also
Local Councils in Northern Ireland

References

External links
Lisburn City Council

 
Politics of County Antrim
Politics of County Down
Lisburn
District councils of Northern Ireland, 1973–2015